"Obsessed" is the debut single by American singer and social media personality Addison Rae, released through Sandlot Records and AWAL on March 18, 2021. An accompanying music video was released alongside the single. The song is set to be a part of Rae's debut EP which is expected to be released sometime in 2023.

Background and composition 
"Obsessed" is a dance-pop song. The lyrics are about a relationship and self-hate. At a young age, Rae was influenced by her mother's playlist which included music from the 1990s and 2000s. In an interview with Vogue, Rae identifies Beyoncé, Jennifer Lopez, Britney Spears, and Katy Perry as musical influences. She cited Taylor Swift as an inspiration for the song.

Production 
Preceding the release, Rae worked with songwriter Jacob Kasher Hindlin (Jkash) to study songwriting. Rae released the song through Hindlin's independent label, Sandlot Records. They worked with manager Adam Mersel, and publicists Katie Greenthal and Courtni Asbury of The Lede Company. After four months in the Hindlin's studio, Rae and her team developed most of "Obsessed" in one session.

Rae performed "Obsessed" on The Tonight Show Starring Jimmy Fallon, marking her debut appearance on a late-night talk show. She released accompanying clothing and poster merchandise.

Reception 
"Obsessed" was critically panned; in a review for PopDust, music critic Langa stated "Addison Rae's embarrassing new single 'Obsessed' proves she should stick to lip syncing". Zoe Haylock of Vulture negatively compared Rae's use of whispering to Selena Gomez. Writing for Entertainment Weekly, Nick Romano described the lyrics as "[reading] more like a text exchange", while assuming the message was "about how obsessed [Rae] is with herself", in contrast with what Rae intended, writing "the execution may have gotten lost in translation".

Writing for British Vogue in 2023, Amel Mukhtar described "Obsessed" as "fabulously camp" and wondered: "Was it shallow trash, or tongue-in-cheek art?"

Commercial performance
In the United States, the song debuted at its peak of number 10 on the Bubbling Under Hot 100 chart issue dated April 3, 2021, which serves as a twenty-five slot extension to the main Billboard Hot 100.

Music video 
The music video, directed by Diane Martel, includes TikTok dances choreographed by Sara Biv and Calvit Hodge. On the day of its release, the single was the sixth video trending on YouTube. Kyle Luu was the stylist. In parts of the video, Rae wore catsuits by LaQuan Smith, clothing by Mugler and a fake fur Gucci bolero. Her white Dion Lee corset was inspired by the Britney Spears' music video for "Sometimes". The catsuit was influenced by the music video of "Say You'll Be There".

Charts

Release history

References

2021 debut singles
2021 songs
Addison Rae songs
Song recordings produced by Benny Blanco
Song recordings produced by Ryan McMahon (record producer)
Songs written by Addison Rae
Songs written by Benny Blanco
Songs written by Ryan McMahon (record producer)
Songs written by Leland (musician)
Songs written by Madison Love